Gersdorf may refer to:

Places:
in Austria
Gersdorf an der Feistritz, in Styria, Austria
in the Czech Republic
 Gersdorf, former German name of a village in the Tetschen district, Bohemia
in Germany:
Gersdorf, Saxony, a municipality in the Chemnitzer Land district, Saxony
Gersdorf, part of Bahretal, Saxony
Gersdorf, part of Haselbachtal, Saxony
Gersdorf, part of Ottendorf-Okrilla, Saxony
several parts of towns and municipalities

in Poland:
Gersdorf, former German name of Dąbie, Lubusz Voivodeship
Gersdorf, former German name of Gawroniec, West Pomeranian Voivodeship

People:
Ernst Gotthelf Gersdorf, 19th-century German librarian
Hans von Gersdorff (surgeon), 16th-century German surgeon 
Henriette Catharina von Gersdorff, 17th-century German poet
Małgorzata Gersdorf (born 1952), Polish judge